Corstorphine is a suburb of southwest Dunedin in the South Island of New Zealand. It is located on the slopes of Calton Hill - a spur of Forbury Hill - between Caversham Valley and the Pacific Ocean. The suburbs of Saint Clair and Forbury lie to the east and south, and Caversham and Lookout Point lie to the north.

Corstorphine is a largely residential suburb, containing a substantial amount of state housing built from the 1930s to the 1960s. Its main roads include Middleton Road, Sidey Street, Riselaw Road, and Corstorphine Road. A small group of shops is located at the top of Middleton Road.

To the west is largely rural land, connected via the rural Blackhead Road and Green Island Bush Road to Green Island and Waldronville. The popular Tunnel Beach lies 1.5 kilometres from the top of Middleton Road and is accessed via Blackhead Road.

On the lower slopes lies the smaller suburb of Kew. Here, Easther Crescent runs along a terrace at the edge of the hill, connecting with Saint Clair at Allandale Road to the south and descending to Forbury Corner and Caversham in the northeast. Kew Park lies at Forbury Corner itself. To the north of Corstorphine, the smaller suburb of Calton Hill connects Corstorphine with the upper Caversham Valley and Lookout Point by way of Riselaw Road.

The name "Corstorphine" comes from the house and land owned by early settler John Sidey, who arrived in Dunedin in 1848. It originates from Corstorphine, a village near Edinburgh, though the names are pronounced differently (the Scottish village has the emphasis on the second syllable, rather than the first). Many of the streets in Corstorphine and Kew are named after places in Scotland, among them Skibo Street, Dornoch Street, and Lockerbie Street.

Sidey's son Sir Thomas became a prominent local and national politician during the later nineteenth century. Sidey's residence, Corstorphine House, was built in 1864 and was substantially extended in 1910. It is one of the suburb's main landmarks.

Demographics

Corstorphine had a population of 3,618 at the 2018 New Zealand census, an increase of 108 people (3.1%) since the 2013 census, and an increase of 261 people (7.8%) since the 2006 census. There were 1,515 households. There were 1,716 males and 1,902 females, giving a sex ratio of 0.9 males per female, with 717 people (19.8%) aged under 15 years, 609 (16.8%) aged 15 to 29, 1,653 (45.7%) aged 30 to 64, and 648 (17.9%) aged 65 or older.

Ethnicities were 84.7% European/Pākehā, 10.4% Māori, 5.7% Pacific peoples, 7.4% Asian, and 3.2% other ethnicities (totals add to more than 100% since people could identify with multiple ethnicities).

The proportion of people born overseas was 19.0%, compared with 27.1% nationally.

Although some people objected to giving their religion, 52.5% had no religion, 35.2% were Christian, 0.7% were Hindu, 0.5% were Muslim, 1.0% were Buddhist and 2.6% had other religions.

Of those at least 15 years old, 768 (26.5%) people had a bachelor or higher degree, and 573 (19.8%) people had no formal qualifications. 369 people (12.7%) earned over $70,000 compared to 17.2% nationally. The employment status of those at least 15 was that 1,299 (44.8%) people were employed full-time, 432 (14.9%) were part-time, and 108 (3.7%) were unemployed.

Education
Corstorphine School was a contributing primary school serving years 1 to 6, which opened in 1950 and closed in 2010 due to declining roll numbers. The site was sold in 2014.

References

Suburbs of Dunedin